Arellano University (AU) is a private, coeducational, nonsectarian university located in Manila, the Philippines. It was founded in 1938 as a law school by Florentino Cayco Sr., the first Filipino Undersecretary of Public Instruction. The university was named after Cayetano Arellano, the first Chief Justice of the Supreme Court of the Philippines. It operates seven campuses located throughout Metro Manila and the main campus is located along Legarda Street, Sampaloc, Manila. The Arellano University School of Law is autonomous and managed by the Arellano Law Foundation. Its athletic team, the Arellano University Chiefs, is a member of the National Collegiate Athletic Association since 2009.

History

Arellano University began in 1938 by Florentino Cayco Sr. It was established as a law school by Cayco, the first Filipino Undersecretary of Public Instruction and an educator. The school was named Arellano Law College, which is derived from Cayetano Arellano, the first Filipino Supreme Court Chief Justice. The newly founded institution offers the regular four-year law course and was one of the well-known institutions at that time catering to numerous prolific people in the field of law and public service.

On the onset of World War II, the school was closed from 1941 to 1945. It was reopened in April 1945 and renamed as the Arellano Colleges. It has expanded course offerings in commerce, foreign service, and arts and sciences. In 1946, Florentino Cayco Sr. became the school's first president, and through his efforts, the institution was granted university status on February 22, 1947, by the Department of Education, Culture, and Sports and was accordingly renamed as Arellano University. AU continued its robust expansion with the offering of new courses, which resulted into the addition of new colleges.

In 1948, from its present site in Legarda at Sampaloc, AU moved to a new site in Plaza Guipit. It was relocated back to its old site in Legarda when a new modern four-storey concrete building was erected in 1955. In 1954, AU opened an institute of nursing and a law school. The Arellano University School of Law would later be managed by the Arellano Law Foundation under a Memorandum of Agreement in 1978. Arellano Law Foundation is a non-stock and non-profit organization established by the alumni, faculty members, and employees of AU whose objective was to establish and operate a law school. The School of Law was successfully turned over to Arellano Law Foundation on April 22, 1979, but remained as one of the constituent colleges of the university.

In 2015, AU entered into a partnership with Ayala Education to launch the LINC@Arellano, a junior college program that serves as an early implementation of the Philippines' K-12 program. Later on, the university began to fully integrate the K-12 program with the offering of Senior High School (SHS) strands.

Campuses and locations

At present, Arellano operates on seven campuses located throughout Metro Manila.

Administration and organization

Arellano is governed by its CEO, a board of trustees, and the corporate officers. The CEO manages the overall operational performance of AU. All campuses of Arellano are under the CEO's direct control and supervision.

Academics and research

Arellano University is formed by five academic clusters that cater to undergraduates and postgraduates. Two clusters, the Allied Medical Services and the College of Business and Technology, are formed by one or more colleges, schools, or an institute. Arellano also has its own elementary and high schools. All academic programs are offered across its six campuses.

The Florentino Cayco Memorial School of Graduate Studies on Education is the graduate school of AU. It was named after the founder of the university and offers education-related advanced academic degrees.

The Arellano University School of Law (AUSL), established in 1938, is the law school of AU and is managed by the Arellano Law Foundation, a nonstock and nonprofit corporation established by alumni of the university. It is one of the oldest law schools in the Philippines and rose to prominence by producing successful graduates who mold the political history of the country.

The College of Arts and Sciences is the liberal arts school of AU.

The College of Education is the normal school of the university. AU's two elementary schools (Manila and Pasig campuses) and  secondary schools (Manila, Pasig, Pasay, and Malabon campuses) serve as the college's laboratory school. Education students of AU are exposed to international education through its partnership with Hailida International Kindergarten School in Shenzhen, China.

The College of Nursing' leads to the degree of bachelor of science in nursing with an option to finish to complete and earn degree from Edith Cowan University in Perth, Australia.

The College of Allied Medical Services comprises five colleges and one diploma program - the College of Physical Therapy, College of Nursing, College of Radiologic Technology, College of Medical Laboratory Science/Medical Technology, College of Pharmacy, and the diploma program in midwifery.

The College of Business and Technology is a cluster college formed by the Institute of Accountancy, School of Computer Science, School of Business and Administration, and School of Hospitality and Tourism Management.

The College of Criminal Justice Education offers a four-year course leading to a degree of bachelor of science in criminology.

Research
The Research and Publications Department is the official research department of the university.  Arellano is one of the member higher educational institutions  of the joint De La Salle University-CHED Zonal Research Center.

Academic partnerships

AU has several academic partners that aim to facilitate collaborations in teaching, research, joint study programs, staff and student exchange, professional certification, and continuing education. The academic partners include:

 Arizona State University
 Alderson Broaddus University
 Edith Cowan University
 Federation University Australia
 Guangxi Vocational and Technical College
 University of Plymouth
 Gunma University of Health and Welfare

Athletics 

The Arellano University Chiefs are the varsity athletic teams of the university, which is a member of the National Collegiate Athletic Association (NCAA) since joining in 2010 as a probationary member. The Chiefs attained regular member status in NCAA Season 89 on April 2, 2013. The Chiefs also played in the NCRAA, NAASCU, Shakey's V-League and the Fr. Martin's Cup. The Chiefs are also a member of the Development League of the Philippine Basketball Association.

The name "Chiefs" was adopted in honor of the university's namesake Cayetano Arellano, the first Chief Justice of the Supreme Court of the Philippines

Insignia and other representations

Motto and song 

"For God and Country" is the official motto of AU. The university song is called "Arellano Hymn" and is sung in Tagalog.

Seal 

The university's seal is the official scheme used by the university in official documents and official publications.

AU's seal was prepared by National Artist Vicente Manansala and was heavily inspired by a World War II photograph of American marines raising the Flag of the United States on the summit of Mount Suribachi. Similarly, the seal depicts three male youths who raise the Flag of the Philippines. Each of the men symbolizes Luzon, Visayas, and Mindanao. The university seal also contains AU's official motto: "For God and Country".

Notable people

Persons affiliated to the university, either as students, faculty members, or administrators, are known as "Arellianites" and/or "Arellanistas". Throughout the university's history, faculty, alumni, and students have played prominent roles in many different fields. Prominent alumni of Arellano in the film and media industry include Bayani Agbayani, Joey de Leon, and Ted Failon. Public servants who have attended Arellano include lawyer Higino A. Acala Sr., former Senator Rodolfo Biazon, former 4th District of Manila Congresswoman Trisha Bonoan-David, and Francisco Domagoso, former actor and mayor of Manila.

References

External links

 Arellano University - Official website
 Arellano University - School of Law - Official website
 Arellano University - International Nursing Program - Official website
 Arellano University College of Nursing Alumni Association of America - Official website

 
Universities and colleges in Manila
1938 establishments in the Philippines
Educational institutions established in 1938
National Collegiate Athletic Association (Philippines) colleges
Education in Sampaloc, Manila
Education in Pasay
Universities and colleges in Pasig
Education in Malabon
Education in Mandaluyong